Dame Ellen Patricia MacArthur  (born 8 July 1976) is a retired English sailor, from Whatstandwell near Matlock in Derbyshire, now based in Cowes, Isle of Wight.

MacArthur is a successful solo long-distance yachtswoman.  On 7 February 2005, she broke the world record for the fastest solo circumnavigation of the globe, a feat which gained her international renown. Francis Joyon, the Frenchman who had held the record before MacArthur, was able to recover the record again in early 2008.

Following her retirement from professional sailing on 2 September 2010, MacArthur announced the launch of the Ellen MacArthur Foundation, a charity that works with business and education to accelerate the transition to a circular economy.

Early life 

MacArthur was born in Derbyshire where she lived with her parents, who were both teachers, and two brothers Fergus, still in Whatstandwell, and Lewis, who now lives in Pennsylvania. She acquired her early interest in sailing, firstly by her desire to emulate her idol at the time, Sophie Burke, and secondly by reading Arthur Ransome's Swallows and Amazons series of books. She has since become the Patron of the Nancy Blackett Trust which owns and operates Ransome's yacht, Nancy Blackett.

Her first experience of sailing was on a boat owned by her aunt Thea MacArthur on the east coast of England. She saved her school dinner money for three years to buy her first boat, an eight-foot dinghy, which she named Threp'ny Bit even though decimalisation had taken place before she was born. She sellotaped a real 'threepenny bit' coin onto the bow.

MacArthur attended Wirksworth County Infants and Junior Schools and the Anthony Gell School and also worked at a sailing school in Hull. When she was 17, MacArthur bought a Corribee and named it Iduna; she described the first moment she saw it as "love at first sight". In 1995 she sailed Iduna single-handed on a circumnavigation of Great Britain.

In 1997, she finished 17th in the Mini Transat solo transatlantic race after fitting out her 21 ft (6.4 m) Classe Mini yacht Le Poisson herself while living in a French boatyard.

She was named 1998 British Telecom/Royal Yachting Association "Yachtsman of The Year" in the UK and "Sailing's Young Hope" in France.

Asteroid 20043 Ellenmacarthur is named after her.

Professional sailing career 
MacArthur first came to general prominence in 2001 when she finished second in the Vendée Globe solo round-the-world sailing race in her Owen Clarke/Rob Humphreys designed Kingfisher (named after her sponsors, Kingfisher plc), and subsequently MacArthur was appointed a Member of the Order of the British Empire (MBE) for services to sport. At 24, she was the youngest competitor to complete the voyage.

In 2003, she captained a round-the-world record attempt for a crewed yacht in Kingfisher 2 (a catamaran formerly owned by Bruno Peyron and known as Orange), but was thwarted by a broken mast in the Southern Ocean.

A trimaran named B&Q/Castorama (after two companies in the Kingfisher group) unveiled in January 2004, was specially designed by Nigel Irens and Benoit Cabaret for her to break solo records. The 75-foot (23 m) trimaran was built in Australia, with many of the components specifically arranged to take into account MacArthur's 5-foot 2 inch (1.57 m) height. 

Using the yacht, her first significant record attempt in 2004 to break the west–east transatlantic crossing time failed by around one and a quarter hours, after over seven days of sailing.

She began her attempt to break the solo record for sailing non-stop around the world on 28 November 2004. During her circumnavigation, she set records for the fastest solo voyage to the equator, past the Cape of Good Hope, past Cape Horn and back to the equator again. She crossed the finishing line near the French coast at Ushant at 22:29 UTC on 7 February 2005 beating the previous record set by French sailor Francis Joyon by 1 day, 8 hours, 35 minutes, 49 seconds. Her time of 71 days, 14 hours, 18 minutes 33 seconds is world record for the  covered.

On 8 February 2005, following her return to England, it was announced that she was to be made a Dame Commander of the Order of the British Empire (DBE) in recognition of her achievement. It is believed that she is the youngest ever recipient of this honour. Coming immediately after the event being recognised, rather than appearing in due course in the New Year's or Birthday Honours lists, this recognition was reminiscent of accolades previously bestowed upon Francis Drake and Francis Chichester when reaching home shores after their respective circumnavigations in 1580 and 1967. MacArthur was also granted the rank of Honorary Lieutenant Commander, Royal Naval Reserve on the same day.

In recognition of her achievement she was appointed a Knight (Chevalier) of the French Legion of Honour by President Nicolas Sarkozy in March 2008. She is a fluent French speaker.

In 2007 MacArthur headed up BT Team Ellen, a three-person sailing team which includes Australian Nick Moloney and Frenchman Sébastien Josse.

In October 2009 MacArthur announced her intention to retire from competitive racing to concentrate on the subject of resource and energy use in the global economy.

Sailing records 
In June 2000, MacArthur sailed the monohull Kingfisher from Plymouth, UK to Newport, Rhode Island, USA in 14 days, 23 hours, 11 minutes.  This is the current record for a single-handed woman monohull east-to-west passage, and also the record for a single-handed woman in any vessel.

MacArthur's second place in the 2000–2001 edition of the Vendée Globe, with a time of 94 days, 4 hours and 25 minutes, was the world record for a single-handed, non-stop, monohull circumnavigation by a woman. The record stood for 20 years until Clarisse Crémer beat it in 2020-2021 edition of the Vendée Globe.

In June 2004, MacArthur sailed her trimaran B&Q/Castorama from Ambrose Light, Lower New York Bay, USA to Lizard Point, Cornwall, UK in 7 days, 3 hours, 50 minutes.  This set a new world record for a transatlantic crossing by women, beating the previous crewed record as well as the singlehanded version.

In 2005, MacArthur beat Francis Joyon's existing world record for a single-handed non-stop circumnavigation.  MacArthur in the trimaran B&Q/Castorama sailed  at an average speed of 15.9 knots. Her time of 71 days, 14 hours, 18 minutes 33 seconds beat Joyon's then world record time by 1 day, 8 hours, 35 minutes and 49 seconds. She had no more than 20 minutes' sleep at a time during the voyage, having to be on constant lookout day and night. On 23 November 2007 Joyon set off in IDEC 2 in an attempt to beat MacArthur's current world record for a single handed circumnavigation. He achieved his goal in 57 days, 13 hours 34 minutes and 6 seconds. Despite Joyon's reclamation of the record, Robin Knox-Johnston still described MacArthur's time as an "amazing achievement".

Popular culture 
In 2009 McArthur appeared on BBC Radio 4's Desert Island Discs. Her chosen book was The SAS Survival Handbook by John "Lofty" Wiseman and her luxury item was a fluffy worm mascot.

MacArthur was also the last record holder on Star in a Reasonably-Priced Car on the BBC's Top Gear television driving programme until the eighth series, when the car and rules were changed, and previous records were removed. The competition was a timed lap of a racetrack in a Suzuki Liana. She completed the lap in 1 minute 46.7 seconds, beating Jimmy Carr by 0.2 seconds. MacArthur won Top Gear'''s Fastest Driver of the Year award in 2005.

She also took part in 2011 TV series Jamie's Dream School.

There is a display about MacArthur at the Wirksworth Heritage Centre, Derbyshire.

Books
In 2002, MacArthur released her first autobiography entitled Taking on the World. Later she wrote Race Against Time, published in 2005, a day-by-day account of her record journey around the world. In September 2010, she published a second autobiography entitled Full Circle''.

Charities

Ellen MacArthur Cancer Trust

In 2003, MacArthur set up the Ellen MacArthur Trust (now the Ellen MacArthur Cancer Trust), a registered charity, to 8 to 24 year olds sailing to help them regain their confidence whilst recovering from cancer, leukaemia and other serious illnesses.

In 2008 MacArthur joined other sports celebrities to raise £4 million for the Rainbows children's hospice. The aim is to give terminally ill young people their own customised sleeping unit to enable children in separate age groups to have their families stay with them.

Ellen MacArthur Foundation
 
The Ellen MacArthur Foundation (EMF) is a UK registered charity which promotes the circular economy. It does this by developing and promoting the concept of a circular economy, working with business, policy makers and academics.

History
Founded on 23 June 2009, the foundation was publicly launched on 2 September 2010 by MacArthur at the Science Museum. The charity was inspired by MacArthur's sailing experiences.

On 17 May 2017, the Ellen MacArthur Foundation and Prince of Wales' International Sustainability Unit launched a US$2 million prize fund for innovations which work towards the management of waste plastics.

The Ellen MacArthur Foundation is a founding member and partner of the Platform for Accelerating the Circular Economy (PACE), which was launched out of the World Economic Forum.

References

External links 

 Official website of Dame Ellen MacArthur
 
 Wirksworth Heritage Centre

ISAF World Sailor of the Year (female)
English female sailors (sport)
Vendée Globe finishers
British Vendee Globe sailors
2000 Vendee Globe sailors
Single-handed circumnavigating sailors
Laureus World Sports Awards winners
Dames Commander of the Order of the British Empire
Sporting dames
People from Amber Valley
People from Cowes
1976 births
Living people
Chevaliers of the Légion d'honneur
English sailors
English explorers
Female explorers
Founders of charities
The Sunday Times Sportswoman of the Year winners
Royal Naval Reserve personnel